Julian Jacobs (born November 23, 1994) is an American professional basketball player. He played college basketball for USC.

High school career
Jacobs attended Desert Pines High School, where he was named the Las Vegas Review Player of the Year as a senior after averaging 16.2 points, 6.9 rebounds, 5.5 assists and 3.2 steals per game, while leading the Jaguars to a 27–3 record.

College career
Jacobs played three seasons for USC. As a junior, he averaged 11.6 points, 5.4 assists, 4.9 rebounds, and 1.2 steals per game and in Pac-12 play, he averaged a conference-leading 5.5 assists per game in his final collegiate season. This earned him first-team All-Pac-12 honors. After his junior season, he declared for the NBA draft.

Professional career
After going undrafted in the 2016 NBA draft, Jacobs joined the Indiana Pacers for the 2016 NBA Summer League. On September 1, 2016, he signed with the Los Angeles Lakers, but was waived on October 12 after appearing in two preseason games. On October 30, he was acquired by the Los Angeles D-Fenders of the NBA Development League as an affiliate player of the Lakers.

On August 23, 2017, Jacobs was selected by the Agua Caliente Clippers in the NBA G League expansion draft.
On March 21, 2021 Jacobs was signed by the Woodville Warriors, Adelaide Australia, to play in the NBL1 Central Conference.

Personal life
The son of Julie Sadler and Gary Jacobs, he has six brothers and three sisters. He says his favorite players are Derrick Rose and Rajon Rondo for their style of play.

References

External links
USC Trojans bio

1994 births
Living people
Basketball players from Nevada
Delaware 87ers players
Los Angeles D-Fenders players
Point guards
Sportspeople from Las Vegas
USC Trojans men's basketball players
American men's basketball players